Breakfast in Paris is 1982 Australian romantic comedy.<ref>''][http://www.ozornewzealand.com Breakfast in Paris  at    National Film and Sound Archive</ref>

Plot
Fashion executive Jackie Wyatt discovers her boyfriend has been cheating on her. She flies to Paris and bumps into photographer Michael who she at first dislikes but grows to love.

Production
The film was shot in Melbourne and Paris. Parkins agreed to star in the film after Lamond showed her a clip of Mullinar in Breaker Morant.''

"It's an unashamedly lyrical love story, complete with a sentimental soundtrack by a 42-piece orchestra", said Lamond.

References

External links

Breakfast in Paris at Oz Movies

1982 films
Australian romantic comedy films
Films shot in Melbourne
Films shot in Paris
Films set in Paris
Films scored by Brian May (composer)
1980s English-language films
1980s Australian films